San Ildefonso or just Ildefonso, is a masculine name, originally from the Gothic language. It is taken from the name Hildefuns meaning "battle ready" (hild "battle" combined with funs "ready"). It is Latinised as Ildephonsus, and it is possible that Alfonso is a variant of this name. 

It can refer to:

Places
 Cape San Ildefonso, a cape in the Philippines
San Ildefonso Amatlán, a municipality in Oaxaca, Mexico
San Ildefonso Ixtahuacán, a municipality in Guatemala
San Ildefonso Peninsula, a peninsula in the Philippines
San Ildefonso Pueblo, New Mexico, a census-designated place in the USA
San Ildefonso, Bulacan, a municipality in the Philippines
San Ildefonso, Ilocos Sur, a municipality in the Philippines
San Ildefonso, San Vicente, a municipality in El Salvador
San Ildefonso, Coamo, Puerto Rico, a barrio
San Ildefonso, a town in Spain
San Ildefonso Solá, a municipality in Oaxaca, Mexico
San Ildefonso Villa Alta, a municipality in Oaxaca, Mexico
Santo Ildefonso, a parish in Portugal

People
 Saint Ildephonsus of Toledo - archbishop of Toledo in the 7th century
 Blessed Ildefonso Schuster, archbishop of Milan, Italy

Other
 Ildefonso Altar (Der Altar des hl. Ildefonso), a painting by Peter Paul Rubens
 Convent of St. Ildefonso, a book by Regina Marie Roche
 CEIP San Ildefonso, a bilingual school in Madrid
 San Ildefonso, a Spanish ship launched in 1785 and taken into the Royal Navy as HMS Ildefonso in 1805
 Palacio Real de la Granja de San Ildefonso, a palace in the Spanish province of Segovia
 Church of Saint Ildefonso, an 18th-century church in Oporto
 San Ildefonso school also known as the San Ildefonso Self-taught Group, a Native American art movement from 1900–1935 in Northern New Mexico

Treaty of San Ildefonso
 First Treaty of San Ildefonso of 1777 between Spain and Portugal this was settled in Uruguay a region in this time called orbe novo
 Second Treaty of San Ildefonso of 1796 between Spain and France, allying the two nations
 Third Treaty of San Ildefonso of 1800 between Spain and France, by which Spain returned Louisiana to France